KK Split history and statistics in FIBA Europe and Euroleague Basketball (company) competitions.

1970s

1971–72 FIBA European Champions Cup, 1st–tier
The 1971–72 FIBA European Champions Cup was the 15th installment of the European top-tier level professional basketball club competition FIBA European Champions Cup (now called EuroLeague), running from November 4, 1971, to March 23, 1972. The trophy was won by Ignis Varese, who defeated Jugoplastika by a result of 70–69 at Yad Eliyahu Arena in Tel Aviv, Israel. Overall, Jugoplastika achieved in the present competition a record of 8 wins against 5 defeats, in five successive rounds. More detailed:

First round
 Tie played on November 4, 1971, and on November 11, 1971.

|}

Second round
 Tie played on December 2, 1971, and on December 9, 1971.

|}

Quarterfinals
 Tie played on January 5, 1972, and on January 12, 1972.

|}

 Tie played on January 19, 1972, and on February 3, 1972.

|}

 Tie played on February 9, 1972, and on February 17, 1972.

|}

 Group B standings:

Semifinals
 Tie played on March 2, 1972, and on March 9, 1972.

|}

Final
 March 23, 1972 at Sports Palace at Yad Eliyahu in Tel Aviv, Israel.

|}

1972–73 FIBA European Cup Winners' Cup, 2nd–tier
The 1972–73 FIBA European Cup Winners' Cup was the 7th installment of FIBA's 2nd-tier level European-wide professional club basketball competition FIBA European Cup Winners' Cup (lately called FIBA Saporta Cup), running from October 18, 1972, to March 20, 1973. The trophy was won by Spartak Leningrad, who defeated Jugoplastika by a result of 77–62 at Alexandreio Melathron in Thessaloniki, Greece. Overall, Jugoplastika achieved in the present competition a record of 7 wins against 4 defeats, in two successive rounds. More detailed:

First round
 Bye

Second round
 Tie played on November 8, 1972, and on November 15, 1972.

|}

Top 12
 Tie played on December 6, 1972, and on December 13, 1972.

|}

Quarterfinals
 Tie played on January 10, 1973, and on January 17, 1973.

|}

 Tie played on January 24, 1973, and on January 31, 1973.

|}

 Group B standings:

Semifinals
 Tie played on February 28, 1973, and on March 7, 1973.

|}

Final
 March 20, 1973 at Alexandreio Melathron in Thessaloniki, Greece.

|}

1973–74 FIBA Korać Cup, 3rd–tier
The 1973–74 FIBA Korać Cup was the 3rd installment of the European 3rd-tier level professional basketball club competition FIBA Korać Cup, running from November 6, 1973, to April 11, 1974. The trophy was won by the title holder Birra Forst Cantù, who defeated Partizan by a result of 174–154 in a two-legged final on a home and away basis. Overall, Jugoplastika achieved in present competition a record of 5 wins against 5 defeats, in four successive rounds. More detailed:

First round
 Tie played on November 6, 1973, and on November 13, 1973.

|}

Second round
 Tie played on November 27, 1973, and on December 4, 1973.

|}

Top 12
 Tie played on January 8, 1974, and on January 15, 1974.

|}

 Tie played on February 19, 1974, and on February 26, 1974.

|}

 Group B standings:

Semifinals
 Tie played on March 12, 1974, and on March 19, 1974.

|}

1974–75 FIBA European Cup Winners' Cup, 2nd–tier
The 1974–75 FIBA European Cup Winners' Cup was the 9th installment of FIBA's 2nd-tier level European-wide professional club basketball competition FIBA European Cup Winners' Cup (lately called FIBA Saporta Cup), running from November 6, 1974, to March 26, 1975. The trophy was won by Spartak Leningrad, who defeated Crvena zvezda by a result of 63–62 at Palais des Sports de Beaulieu in Nantes, France. Overall, Jugoplastika achieved in the present competition a record of 6 wins against 4 defeats, in four successive rounds. More detailed:

First round
 Bye

Second round
 Tie played on November 27, 1974, and on December 4, 1974.

|}

Quarterfinals
 Tie played on January 8, 1975, and on January 15, 1975.

|}

 Tie played on January 22, 1975, and on January 29, 1975.

|}

 Tie played on February 5, 1975, and on February 12, 1975.

|}

 Group B standings:

Semifinals
 Tie played on February 26, 1975, and on March 5, 1975.

|}

1975–76 FIBA Korać Cup, 3rd–tier
The 1975–76 FIBA Korać Cup was the 5th installment of the European 3rd-tier level professional basketball club competition FIBA Korać Cup, running from October 28, 1975, to March 23, 1976. The trophy was won by Jugoplastika, who defeated Chinamartini Torino by a result of 179–166 in a two-legged final on a home and away basis. Overall, Jugoplastika achieved in present competition a record of 7 wins against 4 defeats plus 1 draw, in five successive rounds. More detailed:

First round
 Bye

Second round
 Tie played on November 18, 1975, and on November 25, 1975.

|}

Top 16
 Tie played on January 6, 1976, and on January 13, 1976.

|}

 Tie played on January 20, 1976, and on January 27, 1976.

|}

 Tie played on February 3, 1976, and on February 10, 1976.

|}

 Group B standings:

Semifinals
 Tie played on February 24, 1976, and on March 2, 1976.

|}

Finals
 Tie played on March 16, 1976, at Dvorana na Gripama in Split, Yugoslavia and on March 23, 1976, at Palasport Parco Ruffini in Turin, Italy.

|}

1976–77 FIBA Korać Cup, 3rd–tier
The 1976–77 FIBA Korać Cup was the 6th installment of the European 3rd-tier level professional basketball club competition FIBA Korać Cup, running from October 19, 1976, to April 5, 1977. The trophy was won by Jugoplastika, who defeated Alco Bologna by a result of 87–84 at Palasport della Fiera in Genoa, Italy. Overall, Jugoplastika achieved in present competition a record of 6 wins against 1 defeat, in five successive rounds. More detailed:

First round
 Bye

Second round
 Bye

Top 12
 Day 1 (January 11, 1977)
Bye

 Day 2 (January 18, 1977)

|}

 Day 3 (January 25, 1977)

|}

 Day 4 (February 8, 1977)
Bye

 Day 5 (February 15, 1977)

|}

 Day 6 (February 22, 1977)

|}

 Group D standings:

Semifinals
 Tie played on March 8, 1977, and on March 15, 1977.

|}

Final
 April 5, 1977 at Palasport della Fiera in Genoa, Italy.

|}

1977–78 FIBA European Champions Cup, 1st–tier
The 1977–78 FIBA European Champions Cup was the 21st installment of the European top-tier level professional basketball club competition FIBA European Champions Cup (now called EuroLeague), running from October 13, 1977, to April 6, 1978. The trophy was won by Real Madrid, who defeated Mobilgirgi Varese by a result of 75–67 at Olympiahalle in Munich, West Germany. Overall, Jugoplastika achieved in the present competition a record of 10 wins against 6 defeats, in two successive rounds. More detailed:

First round
 Day 1 (October 12, 1977)

|}

 Day 2 (October 20, 1977)

|}

 Day 3 (October 27, 1977)

|}

 Day 4 (November 3, 1977)

|}

 Day 5 (November 17, 1977)

|}

 Day 6 (November 24, 1977)

|}

 Group E standings:

Semifinals
 Day 1 (December 8, 1977)

|}

 Day 2 (December 15, 1977)

|}

 Day 3 (January 12, 1978)

|}

 Day 4 (January 19, 1978)

|}

 Day 5 (January 25, 1978)

|}

 Day 6 (February 9, 1978)

|}

 Day 7 (February 16, 1978)

|}

 Day 8 (March 2, 1978)

|}

 Day 9 (March 9, 1978)

|}

 Day 10 (March 16, 1978)

|}

 Semifinals group stage standings:

1978–79 FIBA Korać Cup, 3rd–tier
The 1978–79 FIBA Korać Cup was the 8th installment of the European 3rd-tier level professional basketball club competition FIBA Korać Cup, running from October 31, 1978, to March 20, 1979. The trophy was won by Partizan, who defeated Arrigoni Rieti by a result of 108–98 at Hala Pionir in Belgrade, Yugoslavia. Overall, Jugoplastika achieved in present competition a record of 7 wins against 3 defeats, in four successive rounds. More detailed:

First round
 Bye

Second round
 Tie played on November 21, 1978, and on November 28, 1978.

|}

Top 16
 Day 1 (January 9, 1979)

|}

 Day 2 (January 16, 1979)

|}

 Day 3 (January 23, 1979)

|}

 Day 4 (January 30, 1979)

|}

 Day 5 (February 6, 1979)

|}

 Day 6 (February 13, 1979)

|}

 Group C standings:

Semifinals
 Tie played on February 27, 1979, and on March 6, 1979.

|}

1980s

1979–80 FIBA Korać Cup, 3rd–tier
The 1979–80 FIBA Korać Cup was the 9th installment of the European 3rd-tier level professional basketball club competition FIBA Korać Cup, running from October 31, 1979, to March 26, 1980. The trophy was won by Arrigoni Rieti, who defeated Cibona by a result of 76–71 at Country Hall du Sart Tilman in Liège, Belgium. Overall, Jugoplastika achieved in the present competition a record of 7 wins against 1 defeat, in four successive rounds. More detailed:

First round
 Bye

Second round
 Bye

Top 16
 Day 1 (January 9, 1980)

|}

 Day 2 (January 16, 1980)

|}

 Day 3 (January 23, 1980)

|}

 Day 4 (February 6, 1980)

|}

 Day 5 (February 12, 1980)

|}

 Day 6 (February 20, 1980)

|}

 Group D standings:

Semifinals
 Tie played on March 5, 1980, and on March 12, 1980.

|}
*The score in the second leg at the end of regulation was 97–86 for Jugoplastika, so it was necessary to play an extra-time to decide the winner of this match.

1980–81 FIBA Korać Cup, 3rd–tier
The 1980–81 FIBA Korać Cup was the 10th installment of the European 3rd-tier level professional basketball club competition FIBA Korać Cup, running from October 8, 1980, to March 19, 1981. The trophy was won by Joventut Freixenet, who defeated Carrera Venezia by a result of 105–104 (Overtime (sports)|OT) at Palau Blaugrana in Barcelona, Spain. Overall, Jugoplastika achieved in the present competition a record of 2 wins against 4 defeats, in three successive rounds. More detailed:

First round
 Bye

Second round
 Bye

Top 16
 Day 1 (December 10, 1980)

|}

 Day 2 (December 17, 1980)

|}

 Day 3 (January 14, 1981)

|}

 Day 4 (January 21, 1981)

|}

 Day 5 (January 28, 1981)

|}

 Day 6 (February 4, 1981)

|}

 Group C standings:

1985–86 FIBA European Cup Winners' Cup, 2nd–tier
The 1985–86 FIBA European Cup Winners' Cup was the 20th installment of FIBA's 2nd-tier level European-wide professional club basketball competition FIBA European Cup Winners' Cup (lately called FIBA Saporta Cup), running from October 1, 1985, to March 18, 1986. The trophy was won by FC Barcelona, who defeated Scavolini Pesaro by a result of 101–86 at PalaMaggiò di Castel Morrone in Caserta, Italy. Overall, Jugoplastika achieved in the present competition a record of 6 wins against 4 defeats, in three successive rounds. More detailed:

First round
 Tie played on October 29, 1985, and on November 5, 1985.

|}

Top 16
 Tie played on October 1, 1985, and on October 8, 1985.

|}

Quarterfinals
 Day 1 (December 3, 1985)

|}

 Day 2 (December 10, 1985)

|}

 Day 3 (January 7, 1986)

|}

 Day 4 (January 14, 1986)

|}

 Day 5 (January 21, 1986)

|}

 Day 6 (January 28, 1986)

|}

 Group A standings:

1986–87 FIBA Korać Cup, 3rd–tier
The 1986–87 FIBA Korać Cup was the 16th installment of the European 3rd-tier level professional basketball club competition FIBA Korać Cup, running from October 1, 1986, to March 25, 1987. The trophy was won by FC Barcelona, who defeated Limoges CSP by a result of 203–171 in a two-legged final on a home and away basis. Overall, Jugoplastika achieved in present competition a record of 5 wins against 5 defeats, in three successive rounds. More detailed:

First round
 Tie played on October 1, 1986, and on October 8, 1986.

|}

Second round
 Tie played on October 29, 1986, and on November 5, 1986.

|}

Top 16
 Day 1 (December 3, 1986)

|}

 Day 2 (December 9, 1986)

|}

 Day 3 (January 7, 1987)

|}

 Day 4 (January 14, 1987)

|}

 Day 5 (January 20, 1987)

|}

 Day 6 (January 28, 1987)

|}

 Group B standings:

1987–88 FIBA Korać Cup, 3rd–tier
The 1987–88 FIBA Korać Cup was the 17th installment of the European 3rd-tier level professional basketball club competition FIBA Korać Cup, running from September 23, 1987, to March 9, 1988. The trophy was won by Real Madrid, who defeated Cibona by a result of 195–183 in a two-legged final on a home and away basis. Overall, Jugoplastika achieved in present competition a record of 7 wins against 3 defeats, in three successive rounds. More detailed:

First round
 Tie played on September 23, 1987, and on September 30, 1987.

|}

Second round
 Tie played on October 14, 1987, and on October 21, 1987.

|}

Top 16
 Day 1 (December 2, 1987)

|}

 Day 2 (December 9, 1987)

|}

 Day 3 (December 16, 1987)

|}
*Overtime at the end of regulation (77–77).

 Day 4 (January 6, 1988)

|}

 Day 5 (January 13, 1988)

|}

 Day 6 (January 20, 1988)

|}

 Group D standings:

1988–89 FIBA European Champions Cup, 1st–tier
The 1988–89 FIBA European Champions Cup was the 32nd installment of the European top-tier level professional basketball club competition FIBA European Champions Cup (now called EuroLeague), running from October 13, 1988, to April 6, 1989. The trophy was won by Jugoplastika, who defeated Maccabi Elite Tel Aviv by a result of 75–69 at Olympiahalle in Munich, West Germany. Overall, Jugoplastika achieved in the present competition a record of 12 wins against 6 defeats, in five successive rounds. More detailed:

First round
 Bye

Top 16
 Tie played on November 3, 1988, and on November 10, 1988.

|}

Quarterfinals
 Day 1 (December 8, 1988)

|}

 Day 2 (December 15, 1988)

|}

 Day 3 (December 22, 1988)

|}

 Day 4 (January 4, 1989)

|}

 Day 5 (January 12, 1989)

|}

 Day 6 (January 19, 1989)

|}

 Day 7 (January 26, 1989)

|}

 Day 8 (February 1, 1989)

|}

 Day 9 (February 16, 1989)

|}

 Day 10 (February 22, 1989)

|}

 Day 11 (March 2, 1989)

|}

 Day 12 (March 9, 1989)

|}

 Day 13 (March 16, 1989)

|}

 Day 14 (March 23, 1989)

|}

 Quarterfinals group stage standings:

Final four
The 1989 FIBA European Champions Cup Final Four, was the 1988–89 season's FIBA European Champions Cup Final Four tournament, organized by FIBA Europe.

 Semifinals: April 4, 1989 at Olympiahalle in Munich, West Germany.

|}

 Final: April 6, 1989 at Olympiahalle in Munich, West Germany.

|}

 Final four standings:

1990s

1989–90 FIBA European Champions Cup, 1st–tier
The 1989–90 FIBA European Champions Cup was the 33rd installment of the European top-tier level professional basketball club competition FIBA European Champions Cup (now called EuroLeague), running from September 28, 1989, to April 19, 1990. The trophy was won by Jugoplastika, who defeated FC Barcelona Banca Catalana by a result of 72–67 at Pabellón Príncipe Felipe in Zaragoza, Spain. Overall, Jugoplastika achieved in the present competition a record of 15 wins against 3 defeats, in five successive rounds. More detailed:

First round
 Bye

Top 16
 Tie played on October 26, 1989, and on November 2, 1989.

|}

Quarterfinals
 Day 1 (December 7, 1989)

|}

 Day 2 (December 14, 1989)

|}

 Day 3 (January 4, 1990)

|}

 Day 4 (January 11, 1990)

|}

 Day 5 (January 18, 1990)

|}

 Day 6 (January 25, 1990)

|}

 Day 7 (February 1, 1990)

|}

 Day 8 (February 7, 1990)

|}

 Day 9 (February 22, 1990)

|}

 Day 10 (March 1, 1990)

|}

 Day 11 (March 8, 1990)

|}

 Day 12 (March 15, 1990)

|}

 Day 13 (March 22, 1990)

|}

 Day 14 (March 29, 1990)

|}

 Quarterfinals group stage standings:

Final four
The 1990 FIBA European Champions Cup Final Four, was the 1989–90 season's FIBA European Champions Cup Final Four tournament, organized by FIBA Europe.

 Semifinals: April 17, 1990 at Pabellón Príncipe Felipe in Zaragoza, Spain.

|}

 Final: April 19, 1990 at Pabellón Príncipe Felipe in Zaragoza, Spain.

|}

 Final four standings:

1990–91 FIBA European Champions Cup, 1st–tier
The 1990–91 FIBA European Champions Cup was the 34th installment of the European top-tier level professional basketball club competition FIBA European Champions Cup (now called EuroLeague), running from September 27, 1990, to April 18, 1991. The trophy was won by POP 84, who defeated FC Barcelona Banca Catalana by a result of 70–65 at Palais Omnisports de Paris-Bercy in Paris, France. Overall, POP 84 achieved in the present competition a record of 13 wins against 5 defeats, in five successive rounds. More detailed:

First round
 Bye

Top 16
 Tie played on October 25, 1990, and on November 1, 1990.

|}

Quarterfinals
 Day 1 (December 13, 1990)

|}

 Day 2 (December 20, 1990)

|}
*Overtime at the end of regulation (79–79).

 Day 3 (January 3, 1991)

|}

 Day 4 (January 10, 1991)

|}

 Day 5 (January 17, 1991)

|}

 Day 6 (January 24, 1991)

|}

 Day 7 (January 31, 1991)

|}

 Day 8 (February 7, 1991)

|}

 Day 9 (February 14, 1991)

|}

 Day 10 (February 28, 1991)

|}

 Day 11 (March 7, 1991)

|}

 Day 12 (March 14, 1991)

|}

 Day 13 (March 21, 1991)

|}

 Day 14 (March 28, 1991)

|}

 Quarterfinals group stage standings:

Final four
The 1991 FIBA European Champions Cup Final Four, was the 1990–91 season's FIBA European Champions Cup Final Four tournament, organized by FIBA Europe.

 Semifinals: April 16, 1991 at Palais Omnisports de Paris-Bercy in Paris, France.

|}

 Final: April 18, 1991 at Palais Omnisports de Paris-Bercy in Paris, France.

|}

 Final four standings:

1991–92 FIBA European League, 1st–tier
The 1991–92 FIBA European League was the 35th installment of the European top-tier level professional basketball club competition FIBA European League (now called EuroLeague), running from September 12, 1991, to April 16, 1992. The trophy was won by Partizan, who defeated Montigalà Joventut by a result of 71–70 at Abdi İpekçi Arena in Istanbul, Turkey. Overall, Slobodna Dalmacija achieved in the present competition a record of 7 wins against 7 defeats, in three successive rounds.  More detailed:

First round
 Bye

Second round
 Bye

Top 16
 Day 1 (October 31, 1991)

|}

 Day 2 (November 7, 1991)

|}

 Day 3 (November 28, 1991)

|}

 Day 4 (December 5, 1991)

|}

 Day 5 (December 12, 1991)

|}

 Day 6 (December 18, 1991)

|}

 Day 7 (January 9, 1992)

|}

 Day 8 (January 16, 1992)

|}
*Overtime at the end of regulation (89–89).

 Day 9 (January 23, 1992)

|}

 Day 10 (January 30, 1992)

|}

 Day 11 (February 6, 1992)

|}

 Day 12 (February 13, 1992)

|}

 Day 13 (February 19, 1992)

|}

 Day 14 (February 27, 1992)

|}
*Overtime at the end of regulation (102–102).

 Group A standings:

1992–93 FIBA European Cup, 2nd–tier
The 1992–93 FIBA European Cup was the 27th installment of FIBA's 2nd-tier level European-wide professional club basketball competition FIBA European Cup (lately called FIBA Saporta Cup), running from September 8, 1992, to March 16, 1993. The trophy was won by Sato Aris, who defeated Efes Pilsen by a result of 50–48 at Palasport Parco Ruffini in Turin, Italy. Overall, Slobodna Dalmacija achieved in the present competition a record of 8 wins against 4 defeats, in four successive rounds. More detailed:

First round
 Bye

Second round
 Tie played on October 7, 1992, and on October 8, 1992.

|}

Third round
 Bye

Top 12
 Day 1 (November 24, 1992)

|}

 Day 2 (December 1, 1992)

|}

 Day 3 (December 8, 1992)

|}

 Day 4 (December 15, 1992)

|}

 Day 5 (January 5, 1993)

|}

 Day 6 (January 12, 1993)

|}

 Day 7 (January 20, 1993)

|}

 Day 8 (January 26, 1993)

|}

 Day 9 (February 2, 1993)

|}

 Day 10 (February 9, 1993)

|}

 Group B standings:

1993–94 FIBA European League, 1st–tier
The 1993–94 FIBA European League was the 37th installment of the European top-tier level professional club competition for basketball clubs (now called EuroLeague), running from September 9, 1993, to April 21, 1994. The trophy was won by 7up Joventut, who defeated Olympiacos by a result of 59–57 at Yad Eliyahu Arena in Tel Aviv, Israel. Overall, Croatia Osiguranje achieved in present competition a record of 3 wins against 1 defeat, in two successive rounds. More detailed:

First round
 Tie played on September 9, 1993, and on September 16, 1993.

|}
*Kalev withdrew before the first leg and Croatia Osiguranje received a forfeit (20-0) in both games.

Second round
 Tie played on September 30, 1993, and on October 7, 1993.

|}

Eliminated teams of that round, were given a wild card to participate in the third round of 1993–94 FIBA European Cup, the 2nd–tier level European-wide professional basketball club competition.

1993–94 FIBA European Cup, 2nd–tier
The 1993–94 FIBA European Cup was the 28th installment of FIBA's 2nd-tier level European-wide professional club basketball competition FIBA European Cup (lately called FIBA Saporta Cup), running from September 7, 1993, to March 15, 1994. The trophy was won by Smelt Olimpija, who defeated Taugrés by a result of 91–81 at Centre Intercommunal de Glace Malley in Lausanne, Switzerland. Overall, Croatia Osiguranje achieved in the present competition a record of 8 wins against 3 defeats, in two successive rounds. More detailed:

Third round
 Tie played on October 26, 1993, and on November 2, 1993.

|}

Top 12
 Day 1 (November 23, 1993)

|}

 Day 2 (December 1, 1993)

|}

 Day 3 (December 7, 1993)

|}

 Day 4 (December 14, 1993)

|}

 Day 5 (January 5, 1994)

|}

 Day 6 (January 11, 1994)

|}

 Day 7 (January 19, 1994)

|}

 Day 8 (January 25, 1994)

|}

 Day 9 (February 1, 1994)

|}

 Day 10 (February 9, 1994)

|}

 Group A standings:

1994–95 FIBA European League, 1st–tier
The 1994–95 FIBA European League was the 38th installment of the European top-tier level professional club competition for basketball clubs (now called EuroLeague), running from September 8, 1994, to April 13, 1995. The trophy was won by Real Madrid Teka, who defeated Olympiacos by a result of 73–61 at Pabellón Príncipe Felipe in Zaragoza, Spain. Overall, Croatia Osiguranje achieved in present competition a record of 3 wins against 1 defeat, in two successive rounds. More detailed:

First round
 Tie played on September 8, 1994, and on September 9, 1994.

|}

Second round
 Tie played on September 29, 1994, and on October 4, 1994.

|}

Eliminated teams of that round, were given a wild card to participate in the third round of 1994–95 FIBA European Cup, the 2nd–tier level European-wide professional basketball club competition.

1994–95 FIBA European Cup, 2nd–tier
The 1994–95 FIBA European Cup was the 29th installment of FIBA's 2nd-tier level European-wide professional club basketball competition FIBA European Cup (lately called FIBA Saporta Cup), running from September 6, 1994, to March 14, 1995. The trophy was won by Benetton Treviso, who defeated Taugrés by a result of 94–86 at Abdi İpekçi Arena in Istanbul, Turkey. Overall, Croatia Osiguranje achieved in the present competition a record of 6 wins against 6 defeats, in two successive rounds. More detailed:

Third round
 Tie played on October 26, 1994, and on November 2, 1994.

|}

Top 12
 Day 1 (November 23, 1994)

|}

 Day 2 (November 29, 1994)

|}

 Day 3 (December 6, 1994)

|}

 Day 4 (December 13, 1994)

|}

 Day 5 (January 3, 1995)

|}

 Day 6 (January 10, 1995)

|}

 Day 7 (January 18, 1995)

|}

 Day 8 (January 24, 1995)

|}

 Day 9 (January 31, 1995)

|}

 Day 10 (February 7, 1995)

|}

 Group A standings:

1995–96 FIBA Korać Cup, 3rd–tier
The 1995–96 FIBA Korać Cup was the 25th installment of the European 3rd-tier level professional basketball club competition FIBA Korać Cup, running from September 6, 1995, to March 13, 1996. The trophy was won by Efes Pilsen, who defeated Stefanel Milano by a result of 146–145 in a two-legged final on a home and away basis. Overall, Croatia Osiguranje achieved in present competition a record of 4 wins against 2 defeats, in three successive rounds. More detailed:

First round
 Tie played on September 6, 1995, and on September 13, 1995.

|}
*Bosna withdrew before the first leg and Croatia Osiguranje received a forfeit (20-0) in both games.

Second round
 Tie played on September 28, 1995, and on October 3, 1995.

|}

Third round
 Tie played on October 25, 1995, and on November 1, 1995.

|}

1996–97 FIBA EuroLeague, 1st–tier
The 1996–97 FIBA EuroLeague was the 40th installment of the European top-tier level professional club competition for basketball clubs (now called simply EuroLeague), running from September 19, 1996, to April 24, 1997. The trophy was won by Olympiacos, who defeated FC Barcelona Banca Catalana by a result of 73–58 at PalaEUR in Rome, Italy. Overall, Croatia Osiguranje achieved in present competition a record of 7 wins against 9 defeats, in two successive rounds. More detailed:

First round
 Day 1 (September 18, 1996)

|}

 Day 2 (September 26, 1996)

|}

 Day 3 (October 3, 1996)

|}

 Day 4 (October 9, 1996)

|}

 Day 5 (October 17, 1996)

|}

 Day 6 (November 6, 1996)

|}

 Day 7 (November 14, 1996)

|}

 Day 8 (November 21, 1996)

|}

 Day 9 (December 4, 1996)

|}

 Day 10 (December 11, 1996)

|}

 Group C standings:

Second round
 Day 1 (January 9, 1997)

|}

 Day 2 (January 15, 1997)

|}

 Day 3 (January 23, 1997)

|}

 Day 4 (February 6, 1997)

|}

 Day 5 (February 12, 1997)

|}

 Day 6 (February 20, 1997)

|}

 Group H standings:

1997–98 FIBA EuroLeague, 1st–tier
The 1997–98 FIBA EuroLeague was the 41st installment of the European top-tier level professional club competition for basketball clubs (now called simply EuroLeague), running from September 18, 1997, to April 23, 1998. The trophy was won by Kinder Bologna, who defeated AEK by a result of 58–44 at Palau Sant Jordi in Barcelona, Spain. Overall, Split achieved in present competition a record of 5 wins against 13 defeats, in three successive rounds. More detailed:

First round
 Day 1 (September 17, 1997)

|}

 Day 2 (September 25, 1997)

|}

 Day 3 (October 2, 1997)

|}

 Day 4 (October 8, 1997)

|}

 Day 5 (October 23, 1997)

|}

 Day 6 (November 5, 1997)

|}

 Day 7 (November 12, 1997)

|}

 Day 8 (November 19, 1997)

|}

 Day 9 (December 10, 1997)

|}

 Day 10 (December 18, 1997)

|}

 Group B standings:

Second round
 Day 1 (January 8, 1998)

|}

 Day 2 (January 15, 1998)

|}

 Day 3 (January 22, 1998)

|}

 Day 4 (February 4, 1998)

|}

 Day 5 (February 12, 1998)

|}

 Day 6 (February 19, 1998)

|}

 Group E standings:

Top 16
 Best-of-3 playoff: Game 1 away on March 3, 1998 / Game 2 at home on March 5, 1998.

|}

1998–99 FIBA Saporta Cup, 2nd–tier
The 1998–99 FIBA Saporta Cup was the 33rd installment of FIBA's 2nd-tier level European-wide professional club basketball competition FIBA Saporta Cup, running from September 22, 1998, to April 13, 1999. The trophy was won by Benetton Treviso, who defeated Pamesa Valencia by a result of 64–60 at Pabellón Príncipe Felipe in Zaragoza, Spain. Overall, Split achieved in the present competition a record of 7 wins against 7 defeats, in three successive rounds. More detailed:

First round
 Day 1 (September 22, 1998)

|}

 Day 2 (September 29, 1998)

|}

 Day 3 (October 6, 1998)

|}

 Day 4 (October 13, 1998)

|}

 Day 5 (October 20, 1998)

|}

 Day 6 (November 3, 1998)

|}

 Day 7 (November 10, 1998)

|}

 Day 8 (November 17, 1998)

|}

 Day 9 (December 8, 1998)

|}

 Day 10 (December 15, 1998)

|}

 Group B standings:

Second round
 Tie played on January 12, 1999, and on January 19, 1999.

|}

Top 16
 Tie played on February 9, 1999, and on February 16, 1999.

|}

2000s

1999–2000 FIBA Saporta Cup, 2nd–tier
The 1999–2000 FIBA Saporta Cup was the 34th installment of FIBA's 2nd-tier level European-wide professional club basketball competition FIBA Saporta Cup, running from September 21, 1999, to April 11, 2000. The trophy was won by AEK, who defeated Kinder Bologna by a result of 83–76 at Centre Intercommunal de Glace de Malley in Lausanne, Switzerland. Overall, Split CO achieved in the present competition a record of 8 wins against 6 defeats, in three successive rounds. More detailed:

First round
 Day 1 (September 21, 1999)

|}

 Day 2 (September 28, 1999)

|}

 Day 3 (October 5, 1999)

|}

 Day 4 (October 13, 1999)

|}

 Day 5 (October 19, 1999)

|}

 Day 6 (November 2, 1999)

|}

 Day 7 (November 9, 1999)

|}

 Day 8 (November 17, 1999)

|}

 Day 9 (December 7, 1999)

|}

 Day 10 (December 14, 1999)

|}

 Group G standings:

Second round
 Tie played on January 11, 2000, and on January 19, 2000.

|}

Top 16
 Tie played on February 8, 2000, and on February 15, 2000.

|}

2000–01 FIBA SuproLeague, 1st–tier
The 2000–01 FIBA SuproLeague was the FIBA European professional club basketball Champions' Cup for the 2000–01 season, running from October 19, 2000, to May 13, 2001. Up until that season, there was one cup, the FIBA European Champions' Cup (which is now called the EuroLeague), though in this season of 2000–01, the leading European teams split into two competitions: the FIBA SuproLeague and Euroleague Basketball Company's Euroleague 2000–01. The trophy was won by Maccabi Elite Tel Aviv, who defeated Panathinaikos by a result of 81–67 at Palais Omnisports de Paris-Bercy in Paris, France. Overall, Split CO achieved in the present competition a record of 15 wins against 8 defeats, in three successive rounds. More detailed:

Regular season
 Day 1 (October 18, 2000)

|}

 Day 2 (October 26, 2000)

|}

 Day 3 (November 1, 2000)

|}

 Day 4 (November 9, 2000)

|}
*Overtime at the end of regulation (74–74).

 Day 5 (November 15, 2000)

|}

 Day 6 (December 7, 2000)

|}

 Day 7 (December 13, 2000)

|}

 Day 8 (December 21, 2000)

|}

 Day 9 (January 4, 2001)

|}

 Day 10 (January 11, 2001)

|}

 Day 11 (January 18, 2001)

|}

 Day 12 (February 1, 2001)

|}

 Day 13 (February 8, 2001)

|}

 Day 14 (February 14, 2001)

|}

 Day 15 (February 22, 2001)

|}

 Day 16 (February 28, 2001)

|}

 Day 17 (March 8, 2001)

|}

 Day 18 (March 15, 2001)

|}

 Group A standings:

Top 16
 Best-of-3 playoff: Game 1 at home on March 27, 2001 / Game 2 away on March 29, 2001.

|}

Quarterfinals
 Best-of-3 playoff: Game 1 away on April 17, 2001 / Game 2 at home on April 19, 2001 / Game 3 away on April 26, 2001.

|}

2001–02 Euroleague, 1st–tier
The 2001–02 Euroleague was the 2nd season of the EuroLeague, under the newly formed Euroleague Basketball Company's authority, and it was the 45th installment of the European top-tier level professional club competition for basketball clubs, running from October 10, 2001, to May 5, 2002. The trophy was won by Panathinaikos, who defeated the title holder Kinder Bologna by a result of 89–83 at PalaMalaguti in Bologna, Italy. Overall, Split CO achieved in present competition a record of 1 win against 3 defeats, in two successive rounds. More detailed:

First qualifying round
 Tie played on September 13, 2001, and on September 16, 2001.

|}

Second qualifying round
 Tie played on September 20, 2001, and on September 23, 2001.

|}

The seven eliminated teams of the three qualifying rounds, were given a wild card to participate in the regular season of 2001–02 FIBA Saporta Cup, the 2nd–tier level European-wide professional basketball club competition.

2001–02 FIBA Saporta Cup, 2nd–tier
The 2001–02 FIBA Saporta Cup was the 36th installment of FIBA's 2nd-tier level European-wide professional club basketball competition FIBA Saporta Cup, running from October 30, 2001, to April 30, 2002. The trophy was won by Montepaschi Siena, who defeated Pamesa Valencia by a result of 81–71 at Palais des Sports de Gerland in Lyon, France. Overall, Split CO achieved in the present competition a record of 5 wins against 7 defeats, in two successive rounds. More detailed:

Regular season
 Day 1 (October 30, 2001)

|}

 Day 2 (November 6, 2001)

|}

 Day 3 (November 13, 2001)

|}
*Overtime at the end of regulation (75–75).

 Day 4 (December 4, 2001)

|}

 Day 5 (December 11, 2001)

|}

 Day 6 (December 18, 2001)

|}

 Day 7 (January 8, 2002)

|}
*Overtime at the end of regulation (79–79).

 Day 8 (January 15, 2002)

|}

 Day 9 (January 29, 2002)

|}

 Day 10 (February 5, 2002)

|}

 Group D standings:

Top 16
 Tie played on February 26, 2002, and on March 5, 2002.

|}

2002–03 FIBA Europe Champions Cup, 4th–tier
The 2002–03 FIBA Europe Champions Cup was the 1st installment of FIBA's 4th-tier level European-wide professional club basketball competition FIBA Europe Champions Cup (lately called FIBA EuroCup Challenge), running from October 1, 2002, to May 4, 2003. The trophy was won by Aris, who defeated Prokom Trefl Sopot by a result of 84–83 at Alexandreio Melathron in Thessaloniki, Greece. Overall, Split CO achieved in the present competition a record of 2 wins against 6 defeats, in only one round. More detailed:

Regular season
 Day 1 (October 1, 2002)

|}
*Three overtimes at the end of regulation (90–90, 98–98 and 113–113).

 Day 2 (October 8, 2002)

|}

 Day 3 (October 15, 2002)

|}

 Day 4 (October 22, 2002)
Bye

 Day 5 (October 29, 2002)

|}

 Day 6 (November 5, 2002)

|}

 Day 7 (November 12, 2002)

|}

 Day 8 (December 3, 2002)

|}

 Day 9 (December 10, 2002)
Bye

 Day 10 (December 17, 2002)

|}

 Conference South Group C standings:

2003–04 ULEB Cup, 2nd–tier
The 2003–04 ULEB Cup was the 2nd installment of ULEB's 2nd-tier level European-wide professional club basketball competition ULEB Cup (lately called EuroCup Basketball), running from November 11, 2003, to April 13, 2004. The trophy was won by Hapoel Migdal Jerusalem, who defeated Real Madrid by a result of 83–72 at Spiroudome in Charleroi, Belgium. Overall, Split CO achieved in the present competition a record of 4 wins against 6 defeats, in only ony round. More detailed:

Regular season
 Day 1 (November 11, 2003)

|}
*Overtime at the end of regulation (78–78).

 Day 2 (November 18, 2003)

|}

 Day 3 (November 25, 2003)

|}

 Day 4 (December 2, 2003)

|}

 Day 5 (December 10, 2003)

|}

 Day 6 (December 16, 2003)

|}

 Day 7 (January 6, 2004)

|}

 Day 8 (January 13, 2004)

|}

 Day 9 (January 20, 2004)

|}
*Overtime at the end of regulation (77–77).

 Day 10 (January 27, 2004)

|}

 Group F standings:

Worldwide and other prestigious (semi-official) European competitions

1973 VII FIBA Intercontinental Cup "William Jones"
The 1973 VII FIBA Intercontinental Cup "William Jones" was the 7th installment of the FIBA Intercontinental Cup for men's professional basketball clubs, running from May 1, 1973, to May 5, 1973. It took place at Ginásio do Ibirapuera in São Paulo, Brazil and the trophy was won by Ignis Varese.

Round-robin tournament
 Day 1 (May 1, 1973)

|}

 Day 2 (May 2, 1973)

|}

 Day 3 (May 3, 1973)

|}

 Day 4 (May 4, 1973)
Bye

 Day 5 (May 5, 1973)

|}

 Final standings:

1988 VI ACB International Tournament "V Memorial Héctor Quiroga"
The 1988 VI ACB International Tournament "V Memorial Héctor Quiroga" was the 6th semi-official installment of the European Basketball Club Super Cup for men's professional basketball clubs, running from October 11, 1988, to October 13, 1988. It took place at Pabellón Municipal in Puerto Real, Spain, and the trophy was won by Real Madrid.

Round-robin tournament
 Day 1 (October 11, 1988)

|}

 Day 2 (October 12, 1988)

|}

 Day 3 (October 13, 1988)

|}

 Final standings:

1989 VII ACB International Tournament "VI Memorial Héctor Quiroga"
The 1989 VII ACB International Tournament "VI Memorial Héctor Quiroga" was the 7th semi-official installment of the European Basketball Club Super Cup for men's professional basketball clubs, running from October 8, 1989, to October 10, 1989. It took place at Pabellón Municipal in Puerto Real, Spain, and the trophy was won by Real Madrid.

Round-robin tournament
 Day 1 (October 8, 1989)

|}

 Day 2 (October 9, 1989)

|}

 Day 3 (October 10, 1989)

|}

 Final standings:

1989 McDonald's Open
The 1989 McDonald's Open was the 3rd installment of the international men's professional basketball club tournament McDonald's Open (lately called McDonald's Championship), running from October 20, 1989, to October 22, 1989. It took place at PalaEUR in Rome, Italy, and the trophy was won by Denver Nuggets, who defeated Jugoplastika by a result of 135–129.

Semifinals
 20 October 1989 at PalaEUR in Rome, Italy.

|}

Final
 22 October 1989 at PalaEUR in Rome, Italy.

|}

 Final standings:

1989 XXV FIBA International Christmas Tournament
The 1989 XXV FIBA International Christmas Tournament "Trofeo Raimundo Saporta-Memorial Fernando Martín" was the 25th installment of the international men's professional basketball club tournament FIBA International Christmas Tournament, running from December 24, 1989, to December 26, 1989. It took place at Palacio de Deportes de la Comunidad de Madrid in Madrid, Spain, and the trophy was won by Jugoplastika.

Round-robin tournament
 Day 1 (December 24, 1989)

|}

 Day 2 (December 25, 1989)

|}

 Day 3 (December 26, 1989)

|}

 Final standings:

1990 VIII ACB International Tournament "VII Memorial Héctor Quiroga"
The 1990 VIII ACB International Tournament "VII Memorial Héctor Quiroga" was the 8th semi-official installment of the European Basketball Club Super Cup for men's professional basketball clubs, running from September 7, 1990, to September 9, 1990. It took place at Pabellón Municipal in Puerto Real, Spain, and the trophy was won by POP 84.

Round-robin tournament
 Day 1 (September 7, 1990)

|}

 Day 2 (September 8, 1990)

|}

 Day 3 (September 9, 1990)

|}

 Final standings:

1990 McDonald's Open
The 1990 McDonald's Open was the 4th installment of the international men's professional basketball club tournament McDonald's Open (lately called McDonald's Championship), running from October 11, 1990, to October 13, 1990. It took place at Palau Sant Jordi in Barcelona, Spain, and the trophy was won by New York Knicks, who defeated POP 84 by a result of 117–101.

Semifinals
 11 October 1990 at Palau Sant Jordi in Barcelona, Spain.

|}

Final
 13 October 1990 at Palau Sant Jordi in Barcelona, Spain.

|}

 Final standings:

1990 XXVI FIBA International Christmas Tournament
The 1990 XXVI FIBA International Christmas Tournament "Trofeo Raimundo Saporta-Memorial Fernando Martín" was the 26th installment of the international men's professional basketball club tournament FIBA International Christmas Tournament, running from December 24, 1990, to December 26, 1990. It took place at Palacio de Deportes de la Comunidad de Madrid in Madrid, Spain, and the trophy was won by Real Madrid Otaysa.

Round-robin tournament
 Day 1 (December 24, 1990)

|}

 Day 2 (December 25, 1990)

|}

 Day 3 (December 26, 1990)

|}

 Final standings:

1991 IX ACB International Tournament "VIII Memorial Héctor Quiroga"
The 1991 IX ACB International Tournament "VIII Memorial Héctor Quiroga" was the 9th semi-official installment of the European Basketball Club Super Cup for men's professional basketball clubs, running from September 6, 1991, to September 8, 1991. It took place at Pabellón Municipal in Puerto Real, Spain. The trophy was won by Maccabi Elite Tel Aviv.

Round-robin tournament
 Day 1 (September 6, 1991)

|}

 Day 2 (September 7, 1991)

|}

 Day 3 (September 8, 1991)

|}

 Final standings:

1991 McDonald's Open
The 1991 McDonald's Open was the 5th installment of the international men's professional basketball club tournament McDonald's Open (lately called McDonald's Championship), running from October 18, 1991, to October 19, 1991. It took place at Palais Omnisports de Paris-Bercy in Paris, France, and the trophy was won by Los Angeles Lakers, who defeated Montigalà Joventut by a result of 116–114.

Semifinals
 18 October 1991 at Palais Omnisports de Paris-Bercy in Paris, France.

|}

3rd place game
 19 October 1991 at Palais Omnisports de Paris-Bercy in Paris, France.

|}

 Final standings:

Record
KK Split has overall, from 1971 to 1972 (first participation) to 2003–04 (last participation): 218 wins against 152 defeats plus 2 draws in 372 games for all the European club competitions.

 EuroLeague: 99–67 (166)
 FIBA Saporta Cup: 63–45 plus 1 draw (109) /// EuroCup Basketball: 4–6 (10)
 FIBA Korać Cup: 50–28 plus 1 draw (79)
 FIBA EuroCup Challenge: 2–6 (8)

Also KK Split has a 1–3 record in the FIBA Intercontinental Cup and a 2–4 record in McDonald's Championship.

See also
 Yugoslav basketball clubs in European competitions

Notes

References

External links
FIBA Europe
EuroLeague
ULEB
EuroCup

Europe
Split